Gunnarsdóttir is a surname of Icelandic origin, meaning daughter of Gunnar. In Icelandic names, the name is not strictly a surname, but a patronymic. Notable people with the surname include:

Elín Ebba Gunnarsdóttir (born 1953), Icelandic author
Halla Gunnarsdóttir (born 1981), Iceland politician, journalist and writer
Þorgerður Katrín Gunnarsdóttir (born 1965), Icelandic politician; government minister and member of the Alþing since 1999

See also
Gunnarsson

Icelandic-language surnames